Margaret Scarf (née Klein; May 13, 1932) is an American writer, journalist, and lecturer.

Life and career 
Her award-winning books and articles specialize in women, family relationships, and marriage in particular, including the best-selling books Unfinished Business: Pressure Points in the Lives of Women (Doubleday, 1980) and Intimate Partners: Patterns in Love and Marriage (Random House, 1987). She is a former Visiting Fellow at the Whitney Humanities Center, Yale University, and at Jonathan Edwards College, Yale University, as well as a Senior Fellow at the Bush Center in Child Development and Social Policy at Yale. She was a Contributing Editor to The New Republic, and a member of the advisory board of the American Psychiatric Press. 

Maggie Scarf resided in Sag Harbor, NY with her husband Herbert Scarf (1930–2015), economist and Sterling Professor of Economics at Yale University. They have three daughters: Susan Scarf Merrell, Martha Samuelson, and Betsy S. Stone. She has eight grandchildren.

Public and media appearances

Scarf has lectured widely and made several television appearances (Oprah Winfrey, 5 times; Phil Donohue; The David Letterman Show; CBS News; Good Morning America; The Today Show; and radio shows including Larry King.) She has been interviewed extensively on radio and for magazines and newspapers.

As of 2014, she blogs for Psychology Today.

Bibliography
 Body, Mind, Behavior, New Republic Press, 1976, 
 Unfinished Business: Pressure Points in the Lives of Women, Doubleday and Co., Inc., 1980,  
 Intimate Partners: Patterns in Love and Marriage, Random House, 1987, 
 Intimate Worlds: How Families Thrive and Why They Fail, Ballantine Books, 1997, 
 Meet Ben Franklin, Random House Books for Young Readers, 2002, 
 Secrets, Lies, Betrayals: How the Body Holds the Secrets of a Life, and How to Unlock Them, Ballantine Books, 2005; Reprint edition. 
 September Songs: The Good News About Marriage in the Later Years, Riverhead, 2009, 
 The Remarriage Blueprint: How Remarried Couples and Their Families Succeed or Fail, Scribner, 2013,

Representative Articles

 Brain researcher Jose Delgado asks: What Kind of Humans Would We Like to Construct? New York Times, Nov 15, 1970 
 The Man Who Gave Us 'Inferiority Complex,' 'Compensation,' `Overcompensation.' New York Times, Feb 28, 1971. 
 Oh, For a Decent Night's Sleep! New York Times, Oct 21, 1973. 
 From Joy to Depression.  New York Times, Apr 24, 1977.  
 The More Sorrowful Sex. Psychology Today, April 1979.
 The Mind of the Unabomber. The New Republic, Jun 10, 1996.

Honors, Fellowships, and Prizes
 Ford Foundation Fellow, 1973–74
 Nieman Fellow in Journalism (Harvard) 1975-76
 Fellow, Center for Advanced Study in the Behavioral Sciences, 1977–78
 Alicia Patterson Foundation Fellow, 1978–79
 Fellow, Center for Advanced Study in the Behavioral Sciences, 1985–86
 Grantee, The Smith Richardson Foundation, Inc., 1991, 1992, 1993, 1994
 National Media Award, American Psychological Foundation, 1971
 First Prize, National Media Award, American Psychological Foundation, 1974
 National Media Award, American Psychological Foundation, 1977
 Connecticut United Nations Award: Outstanding Connecticut Women, 1987
 Connecticut Psychological Association: Certificate of Appreciation, "in recognition of her contribution to the public understanding of psychological knowledge," 1988
 Certificate of Commendation, Robert T. Morse Writer's Competition, American Psychiatric Association, 1997
 Honoree of the New York State Society for Clinical Social Work, 1998

Professional Memberships
 PEN Writer's Association
 Connecticut Society of Psychoanalytic Psychologists
 The Elizabethan Club of Yale University

References

External links
 Maggie Scarf's Official Website (archived version)
 Why Second Marriages are More Perilous Time Magazine, October 4, 2013
 The Remarriage Blueprint The Huffington Post, January 23, 2014
 Brave New World The New Republic, July 12, 1999

1932 births
Living people
American women journalists
American women writers
Ford Foundation fellowships